Erick Iskersky (born January 25, 1958) is a former professional tennis player from the United States and a three time All-American at Trinity College in Texas.

Career
Iskersky was a three-time All-American for Trinity University (Texas). In 1979, he finished runner-up to Kevin Curren in the Division I NCAA Singles Championship by the scores of 6–2, 6–2, 6–3,  and won the Doubles title with Ben McKown by scores of 6–2, 7–5, 6–3.

He competed in the main singles draw of a Grand Slam tournament four times and made the second round of the 1978 US Open, beating Ricardo Ycaza.

At the 1982 US Open, Iskersky and Jiří Granát made the round of 16 in the men's doubles.

Iskersky won the Lorraine Open in France in 1982 and the 1983 IBM Open in Finland.
He was inducted into the ITA Collegiate Hall of Fame in 2002,
Won the 1978 and 1979 NCAA Indoor Singles title,
Winner of the 1970 and 1976 Western Open,
Winner of the 1972, 1974, and 1975 Western Closed,
Member of the College All American Team in 1977, 1978, and 1979,
Member of the 1976 and 1978 Junior Davis Cup Team
Ohio State High School Champion in 1975 and 1976
Ranked #3 in National Juniors in 1976
Ranked #64 Nationally in 1982
In Junior competition defeated John McEnroe, Eliot Teltscher, and Robert Van't Hof
As a professional he defeated Stefan Edberg, Peter McNamara, and Steve Denton

Grand Prix career finals

Singles: 1 (1–0)

Doubles: 1 (0–1)

Challenger titles

Singles: (1)

References

External links
 
 

1958 births
Living people
American male tennis players
People from Rossford, Ohio
Tennis people from Ohio
Trinity Tigers men's tennis players
Sportspeople from Toledo, Ohio